Cundy is a surname. Notable people with the surname include:

People 
Ian Cundy, English cleric
Jason Cundy, former English footballer
Jody Cundy, English cyclist and swimmer 
Lizzie Cundy, English television presenter 
Martyn Cundy, British mathematics teacher and professor
Nicholas Wilcox Cundy, English architect and engineer
Peter Cundy, British air force pilot
Thomas Cundy (senior) (1765–1825), English architect
Thomas Cundy (junior) (1790–1867), English architect
Thomas Cundy III (1821–1895), English architect

Other 
Bolsover Cundy House, a restored 17th century conduit house
Cundy v Lindsay, an English contract law case